The Moran River is a  river on the Upper Peninsula of Michigan in the United States. It begins at the outlet of Chain Lake just west of St. Ignace and flows west through Freschette Lake to Lake Michigan at West Moran Bay.

See also
List of rivers of Michigan

References

Michigan  Streamflow Data from the USGS

Rivers of Michigan
Rivers of Mackinac County, Michigan
Tributaries of Lake Michigan